The Kern River Beds Formation is a Neogene Period geologic formation in the southeastern San Joaquin Valley, within Kern County, California.

Geography
Where it does not outcrop, it is overlaid by Pleistocene Period alluvium.

Geology
The Kern River Series is composed of non-marine gravels, sands, and clays unconformably overlying the marine Miocene Period rocks in the Kern River area of the San Joaquin Valley. The Kern River Series is divided into an upper unit, the Kern River Beds Formation, and a lower unit named the Chanac Formation, with the wedge of the Etchegoin Formation in the middle in the central and western sections.

The Kern River Beds consists mostly of pale-yellow to light-brown sandstone and conglomerate, with interbeds of greenish-gray or greenish-brown siltstone and mudstone.

Oil sands
The Kern River Oil Field wells are located on a section of the formation north of the Kern River Bluffs and Bakersfield. The producing interval in the Kern River Formation of the Kern River oil field has been divided into two zones separated by water-bearing sand lentils. The lower producing zone is called the China Grade Zone, and the upper is the Kern River Zone.

Fossils
The Kern River Beds Formation preserves fossils dating back to the Neogene Period of the Cenozoic Era.

See also

 
 
 List of fossiliferous stratigraphic units in California
 Paleontology in California

References

Dibblee, T. W., Jr., Bruer, W. G., Hackel, Otto, and Warne, A. H., 1965, Geologic Map of the southeastern San Joaquin Valley, in Hackel, Otto, Chairman, Geology of southeastern San Joaquin Valley, California, Kern River to Grapevine Canyon: American Association of Petroleum Geologists, Pacific Section, April 3, 1965, Guidebook, scale about 1:48,000.
Klausing, R. L., and Lohman, K, E., 1964, Upper Pliocene marine strata on the east side of the San Joaquin Valley, California: U.S. Geological Survey Professional Paper 475-D, p. D14-D17.

Neogene California
Geology of Kern County, California
Geography of the San Joaquin Valley
Geography of Bakersfield, California
Kern River
Pliocene geology